KBWC (91.1 FM) is a radio station broadcasting an urban contemporary format. Licensed to Marshall, Texas, United States, the station serves the Longview-Marshall area.  The station is currently owned by Wiley College.

References

External links

BWC
BWC
Radio stations established in 1977